COBW domain containing 3 is a protein that in humans is encoded by the CBWD3 gene.

References

Further reading